Mein Bushra is a Pakistani television series first broadcast on ARY Digital. It is written by Sanam Mehdi and directed by Ahmed Bhatti. It stars Mawra Hocane in the titular role as one of the seven daughters of her father, who wants to prove him that daughters are equally capable as of sons. It also features Faysal Quraishi, Affan Waheed, Saba Hameed and Waseem Abbas in prominent roles. It aired from 11 September 2014 to 12 February 2015.

At 14th Lux Style Awards, it was nominated for Best TV Play and Best TV Writer.

In 2016, it aired in India on Zindagi.

Plot 

Bushra is the third daughter of her parents and she was named so by her father Nasir because he yearned for male son after her birth, but it couldn't happen and he was blessed with four daughters after Bushra's birth. That's why Nasir considers her as unlucky and doesn't not accept her daughters wholeheartedly. Bushra is determined to do all the jobs that a son can do and her mother is hopeful too about her that one day she will become the supporter of her father.

After her elder sister Fiza's divorce and at the wedding preparations of another sister, to support her father she applies for loan in her office but the request got rejected. Nasir taunts her for it but she doesn't loose hope until she receives a job call from a firm. She is selected on the base of her performance and is promoted shortly after.

Cast 

 Mawra Hocane as Bushra
 Faysal Quraishi as Faraz
 Affan Waheed as Shayan
 Saba Hameed as Sofia
 Waseem Abbas as Nasir
 Faryal Mehmood as Sania
 Saba Faisal as Sabiha
 Shehryar Zaidi as Musa
 Ismat Zaidi as Anusheh's mother
 Birjees Farooqui as Sania's mother
 Taqi Ahmed as Kashan
 Sarah Razi as Nazo

Accolades

References 

2014 Pakistani television series debuts
2015 Pakistani television series endings
ARY Digital original programming